is a private junior college in Maebashi, Gunma, Japan. The predecessor of the school, founded in 1933, was chartered as a women's junior college in 1965. In 1999 it became coeducational.

External links
 Official website 

Educational institutions established in 1933
Private universities and colleges in Japan
Universities and colleges in Gunma Prefecture
Japanese junior colleges
1933 establishments in Japan
Maebashi